Patrick Marcil (born June 2, 1975) is a Canadian mixed martial arts and Lethwei coach. He is a sifu (師傅 ) in Fangshendo, a modified form of Jeet Kune Do. His students include Lethwei World Champion Dave Leduc and UFC middleweight fighter Marc-André Barriault.

Background 
Marcil's coaching was featured in Jet Li's defunct website, VICE, Le Droit, Myanmar Times, Asia Times, La Presse, and Ici Radio-Canada. He trains numerous professional MMA fighters in Gatineau, Quebec, Canada.

Martial arts career 
In 1994, Patrick Marcil along with brother-in-law Stephane Patenaude opened their first Kung Fu school in Orléans and shortly after, their second school in Gatineau, Quebec.

In 2003, Marcil fought at World Extreme Battle in Laval, Quebec winning his fight with a TKO at 2:17 in the first round. At 165 pounds, the 26-year-old Marcil was set to fight in the 160lbs category, but instead faced an undefeated 180lb opponent.

Notable students
In 2009, Patrick Marcil began teaching Sanshou to Dave Leduc at Kung Fu Patenaude in Gatineau. In the Myanmar Times, Leduc explains how Marcil got him ready for Lethwei by teaching him the principles of Jeet Kune Do.

In 2016, for his fights against Too Too and Tun Tun Min, Leduc underwent his training camp in Canada with Marcil.

In 2018, Marcil traveled to Myanmar for the first time to corner Leduc against Diesellek TopkingBoxing and returned in December of the same year for Dave Leduc vs. Tun Tun Min III fight, where his student successfully defended his title.

Filmography

Awards and recognitions 

 Lethwei World
 Nominated for 2019 Coach of the year

References

Bibliography

External links
 

Living people
Canadian male mixed martial artists
Mixed martial artists utilizing wushu
Mixed martial artists utilizing Jeet Kune Do
Mixed martial artists utilizing Lethwei
Canadian wushu practitioners
Canadian Jeet Kune Do practitioners
Canadian Lethwei practitioners
Canadian sports coaches
Mixed martial arts trainers
Kickboxing trainers
1975 births